Saphir, meaning sapphire in several languages, may refer to:

 Saphir (band), a German pop group
 Saphir (rocket), a French sounding rocket
 Saphir (train), a German train
 Jacob Saphir (1822–1886), Russian-Jewish ethnographer, writer, and traveller
 Moritz Gottlieb Saphir (1795–1858), Austrian-Jewish writer
 Saphir Taïder, Algerian football player
 Blue Saphir, a character in the Japanese anime Sailor Moon
 French submarine Saphir, any of four vessels of the French Navy
 Saphir (ship), a French slave ship
 SAPHIR (Sounder for Probing Vertical Profiles of Humidity), an instrument on the Megha-Tropiques spacecraft

See also
 Sapphire (disambiguation)